Oligocentris is a genus of moths of the family Crambidae.

Species
Oligocentris deciusalis (Walker, 1859)
Oligocentris uniformalis Hampson, 1912

References

Natural History Museum Lepidoptera genus database

Pyraustinae
Crambidae genera
Taxa named by George Hampson